Corymbia zygophylla, commonly known as the Broome bloodwood, is a species of small tree or a mallee that is endemic to Western Australia. It has rough, tessellated to fibrous bark on the trunk and branches, a crown of juvenile heart-shaped to lance-shaped, stem-clasping leaves, flower buds in groups of three or seven, white flowers and urn-shaped to shortened spherical fruit.

Description
It has rough, tessellated to fibrous, pale to dark brown bark on the trunk and branches. Flowering occurs in December or January and the flowers are white.

Taxonomy and naming
The Broome bloodwood was first formally described in 1934 by William Blakely who gave it the name Eucalyptus zygophylla and published the description in his book A Key to the Eucalypts from specimens collected near Broome in 1905 by William Vincent Fitzgerald. In 1995 Ken Hill and Lawrie Johnson changed the name to Corymbia zygophylla.

Distribution and habitat
Corymbia zygophylla grows in shallow, red sandy soils on dunes and sandplains. It is mainly found in the southern Kimberley region but there are scattered populations in the Pilbara and Great Sandy Desert in the Carnarvon, Central Kimberley, Dampierland, Great Sandy Desert, Ord Victoria Plain and Pilbara biogeographic regions.

See also
List of Corymbia species

References

zygophylla
Rosids of Western Australia
Myrtales of Australia
Plants described in 1934